Harald or Haraldr is the Old Norse form of the given name Harold. It may refer to:

Medieval

Kings of Denmark
 Harald Bluetooth (935–985/986)

Kings of Norway
 Harald Fairhair (c. 850–c. 933)
 Harald Greycloak (died 970)
 Harald Hardrada (1015–1066)
 Harald Gille (reigned 1130–1136)

Grand Dukes of Kiev
 Mstislav the Great (1076–1132), known as Harald in Norse sagas

King of Mann and the Isles
 Haraldr Óláfsson (died 1248)

Earls of Orkney
 Harald Haakonsson (died 1131)
 Harald Maddadsson (–1206)
 Harald Eiriksson

Others
 Hagrold (fl. 944–954), also known as Harald, Scandinavian chieftain in Normandy
 Harald Grenske (10th century), petty king in Vestfold in Norway
 Harald Klak (–), king in Jutland
 Harald Wartooth, legendary king of Sweden, Denmark and Norway
 Harald the Younger, 9th-century Viking leader

Modern name

Royalty
 Harald V of Norway (born 1937), present King of Norway
 Prince Harald of Denmark (1876–1949)

Arts and entertainment 
 Harald Blüchel (born 1963), German electronic music artist
 Harald Heide-Steen Jr. (1939–2008), Norwegian actor and comedian
 Harald Juhnke (1929–2005), German actor and comedian
 Harald Lander (1905–1971), Danish ballet dancer and choreographer
 Harald Reinl (1908–1986), Austrian film director
 Harald Rønneberg (born 1973), Norwegian television personality
 Harald Sæverud (1897–1992), Norwegian composer
 Harald Schmidt (born 1957), German actor and comedian
 Harald Szeemann (1933–2005), Swiss curator and art historian
 Harald Zwart (born 1965), Norwegian film director

Academia 
 Harald Beyer (literary historian) (1891–1960)
 Harald Bohr (1887–1951), Danish mathematician
 Harald Cramér (1893–1985), Swedish mathematician, actuary, and statistician
 Harald Høffding (1843–1931), Danish philosopher and theologian
 Harald Helfgott (born 1977), Peruvian mathematician
 Harald Herborg Nielsen (1903–1973), American physicist
 Harald zur Hausen (born 1936), German virologist
 Harald Stümpke, pseudonym of Gerolf Steiner (1908–2009), German zoologist

Military
 Harald Auffarth (1896–1946), German flying ace of the First World War
 Harald Freiherr von Elverfeldt (1900–1945), German general of the Second World War
 Harald Hægermark (1894–1965), Swedish Army lieutenant general
 Harald Nugiseks (1921–2014), Estonian army sergeant 
 Harald Öhquist (1891–1971), Finnish general of the Second World War
 Harald Riipalu (1912–1961), Estonian military commander 
 Harald Sunde (general) (born 1954), Norwegian military officer, Chief of Defence of Norway
 Harald Turner (1891–1947), German Nazi SS commander executed for war crimes
 Harald Nicolai Storm Wergeland (1814–1893), Norwegian military officer, politician and mountaineer
 Harald Åkermark (1873–1963), Swedish Navy vice admiral

Sport 
 Harald Aabrekk (born 1956), Norwegian footballer and coach
 Harald Andersson (1907–1985), Swedish athlete
 Harald Baker (1882–1962), Australian rugby union footballer
 Harald Berg (born 1941), Norwegian footballer
 Harald Bohr (1887–1951), Danish Olympic football player and mathematician, and brother of Niels Bohr
 Harald Brattbakk (born 1971), Norwegian footballer
 Harald Cerny (born 1973), Austrian footballer
 Harald Grohs (born 1944), German racing driver
 Harald Grønningen (1934–2016), Norwegian skier
 Harald Kaarmann (1901–1942), Estonian footballer
 Harald Koch (born 1969), Austrian badminton player
 Harald Lechner (born 1982), Austrian professional football referee
 Harald Maartmann (1926–2021), Norwegian cross-country skier
 Harald Nielsen (1941–2015), Danish footballer
 Harald Nielsen (boxer) (1902–1983), Danish boxer
 Harald Økern (1898–1977), Norwegian skier
 Harald Schmid (born 1957), German athlete
 Harald Schumacher (born 1954), German footballer 
 Harald Strøm (1897–1977), Norwegian speed skater
 Harald Sunde (footballer) (born 1944), Norwegian footballer
 Harald Tammer (1899–1942), Estonian journalist, athlete and weightlifter
 Harald Nilsen Tangen (born 2001), Norwegian footballer
 Harald Winkler (born 1962), Austrian bobsledder

Other people
 Harald T. Friis (1893–1976), Danish-American radio engineer
 Harald Glööckler (born 1965), German fashion designer 
 Harald Keres (1912–2010), Estonian physicist
 Harald Johan Løbak (1904–1985), Norwegian politician
 Harald Løvenskiold (1926–1994), Norwegian businessman
 Harald T. Nesvik (born 1966), Norwegian politician
 Harald Petersen (1893–1970), Danish politician 
 Harald Sandberg (born 1950), Swedish diplomat
 Harald Sverdrup (disambiguation)

Fictional 
 Harald Hilding Markurell, the main character of Swedish novel Markurells of Wadköping (1919) by Hjalmar Bergman
 Harald Petersen, a playwright in The Group (1963) by Mary McCarthy

Other uses 
 Harald (restaurant), a chain of restaurants in Finland

See also 
 Harold (disambiguation)
 Herald (disambiguation)
 Herod (disambiguation)

Scandinavian masculine given names
Danish masculine given names
Estonian masculine given names
German masculine given names
Norwegian masculine given names
Swedish masculine given names